Kins may refer to:

People
Ian Kinsler, nicknamed Kins (born 1982), American baseball player

Organisations
KINS-FM, a radio station (106.3 FM) licensed to serve Blue Lake, California, United States
Korea Institute of Nuclear Safety (KINS)

Toys 
The Koosh Kins, a variation on Koosh ball

Places 
 Creech Air Force Base (IATA INS, ICAO KINS)